The Rt Revd Walter Julius Carey (12 July 1875 – 17 February 1955) was an English Anglican clergyman and author who served as Bishop of Bloemfontein in South Africa from 1921 to 1935.  Carey was a rugby union forward who played club rugby for Oxford University and Blackheath and played international rugby for the British Isles XV in their 1896 tour of South Africa.

Personal history
Carey was born in Billesdon, Leicestershire, in 1875 to Alfred Henry Carey, who was an Oxford-educated priest, and was educated at Bedford School before gaining entry to Hertford College, Oxford, in 1894 He received his BA in 1896 and by 1899 he was the curate at the Church of the Ascension in Lavender Hill, London, a post he held until 1908. In 1908 Casey became the librarian for Pusey House, a college of Oxford; and remained there until 1914.

During the war, Carey served as a chaplain to the Royal Navy and was present at the Battle of Jutland, on board the battleship HMS Warspite. Carey married during wartime, to Fanny Emma Parfitt in 1917. They had one child, Wilfred Herbert.

After the end of the war, he was granted the post of warden of the Bishop's Hostel, Lincoln Theological College, remaining at the college only until 1921. He then emigrated to South Africa, becoming the Bishop of Bloemfontein, remaining there until 1934, returning to Britain due to ill-health. Back in England, Carey accepted the post of chief messenger of Society for the Propagation of the Gospel, but resigned from the role the next year. In 1936 he was appointed chaplain of Eastbourne College, holding the office until 1940 and again after the war from 1945 to 1948.

Rugby career
Carey was a keen sportsman, and while at Cambridge as a student, he was captain of the College Boat and won four sporting 'Blues' in The Varsity Match between 1894–1897. In 1894 Carey was selected to represent invitational touring rugby team, the Barbarians, and became forever linked to the team when he instituted the club motto:

Although Carey never played international rugby for England, he was selected in 1896 to represent the British Isles in their tour of South Africa, after being nominated by his university along with Cuth Mullins. Carey played in all four Tests against the South Africans, and scored a try in the opening Test at Port Elizabeth.

Writing career
Carey wrote several theological works, often in relation to his experiences abroad. Although many of his writings were entries within large collected journals, he penned two main works, Good-bye to my Generation, an autobiography, published London & Oxford: A. R. Mowbray, 1951, and Crisis in Kenya: Christian common sense on Mau Mau and the colour bar, published in 1953.

Notes

References
 
 

 

 

1875 births
1955 deaths
Military personnel from Leicestershire
People from Harborough District
English rugby union players
British & Irish Lions rugby union players from England
Oxford University RFC players
Barbarian F.C. players
Blackheath F.C. players
People educated at Bedford School
Alumni of Hertford College, Oxford
English librarians
Royal Navy personnel of World War I
World War I chaplains
Anglican chaplains
English religious writers
Anglican bishops of Bloemfontein
20th-century Anglican Church of Southern Africa bishops
English military chaplains
Rugby union players from Leicestershire
Staff of Lincoln Theological College
Rugby union forwards